Richard Scott Proehl (born March 7, 1968) is a former American football wide receiver in the National Football League (NFL). Proehl played 17 seasons with the Phoenix/Arizona Cardinals, Seattle Seahawks, Chicago Bears, St. Louis Rams, Carolina Panthers, and Indianapolis Colts. He played in four Super Bowls and won two: Super Bowl XXXIV with the Rams and Super Bowl XLI with the Colts. He is remembered as a member of "The Greatest Show on Turf".

After his playing career, Proehl was an assistant coach for the Carolina Panthers through the 2016 season. He returned to the Super Bowl as a coach with the Panthers in 2016. He currently serves as the wide receivers coach for the St. Louis BattleHawks of the XFL.

High school 
Proehl graduated in 1986 from Hillsborough High School in Hillsborough, New Jersey, where he starred in both football and baseball. During his senior season in football, he caught 42 passes for 900+ yards and 13 touchdowns. For his efforts that year, he was named a New York All-Metro selection, the Somerset County Player of the Year, and an All-State pick.

College career
Proehl played college football at Wake Forest University, where he was a four-year letterman in football. He holds the school record for receiving yards (2,949 yards), and touchdowns (25), as well as ranking in the top five in receptions and receiving average. He ended his college career playing in the Blue–Gray Football Classic and the East-West All-Star Game.

Professional career

Proehl was taken in the third round (58th overall) of the 1990 NFL Draft. He set the Cardinals rookie record for receptions and became the first rookie to lead the team in receptions since Bob Shaw in 1950. He played four more seasons for the Cardinals before being traded to the Seattle Seahawks for a draft pick. He spent two seasons with the Seahawks, playing as a backup and accepting a pay cut. He then signed with Chicago for one year, and led the team in receiving categories with 58 receptions, 753 yards, and 7 touchdowns.

Proehl signed with the Rams for the start of the 1998 NFL season on a four-year $6 million contract. As part of "The Greatest Show on Turf", he helped lead the Rams to a championship in the 1999 season at Super Bowl XXXIV, catching a 30-yard pass from Kurt Warner with 4:44 remaining in the NFC Championship that gave them a 11-6 lead; the Rams held on to win the game and advance to the Super Bowl. He caught six passes for 100 yards in that game, which was his best postseason performance in his career. In the Super Bowl, he caught one pass for eleven yards. Two seasons later, he helped the Rams reach Super Bowl XXXVI against the New England Patriots. He caught three passes for 71 yards while also losing a fumble with a touchdown, which tied the game at 17 late in the fourth quarter before the Patriots rallied to win the game. He spent one more season with the Rams in 2002.

Proehl then signed with Carolina as a free agent at the start of the 2003 season. With Carolina, he caught five combined passes in the subsequent postseason run by the Panthers to Super Bowl XXXVIII, but four of them were in the Super Bowl against the New England Patriots, which included a touchdown catch with 1:08 remaining to tie the game at 29. However, the Patriots rallied to win the game on a last-second field goal. He was talked out of retirement for a 16th season by Panther quarterback Jake Delhomme and coach John Fox. Proehl retired and worked as a color analyst with the Rams' television pre-season games and the Rams radio network on various shows and pre-games. On November 29, 2006, Proehl came out of retirement to join the Indianapolis Colts, replacing injured WR Brandon Stokley, and helping them to a victory in Super Bowl XLI.

Coaching career
Proehl was hired by the Carolina Panthers on February 1, 2011 as an Offensive Consultant. He was hired to primarily work with the wide receivers. He was Pro Football Focus's second runner up in their Wide Receiver Coach of the Year award.

In the 2015 season, Proehl and the Panthers reached Super Bowl 50 on February 7, 2016. The Panthers fell to the Denver Broncos by a score of 24–10.

Proehl was hired as wide receivers coach by the St. Louis BattleHawks on September 13, 2022. One of the players whom he coaches with the BattleHawks is his son Austin Proehl.

NFL career statistics

Super Bowl statistics
 Super Bowl XXXIV: 1 reception, 11 yards – St. Louis 23, Tennessee 16
 Super Bowl XXXVI: 3 receptions, 71 yards, 1 touchdown – New England 20, St. Louis 17
 Super Bowl XXXVIII: 4 receptions, 71 yards, 1 touchdown – New England 32, Carolina 29
 Proehl did not catch a pass in Super Bowl XLI.

Achievements
Proehl is known for his role in three memorable playoff games:
 As a member of the Rams in the 1999 NFC Championship Game against the Tampa Bay Buccaneers, Proehl recorded six receptions for 100 yards and caught the game-winning touchdown pass with 4:44 to play. The Rams won 11–6 and went on to win the Super Bowl.
 Two years later, in Super Bowl XXXVI against the New England Patriots, with the Rams trailing 17–10, Proehl caught a touchdown pass with 1:30 to play to tie the game, but the Patriots won on a last-second field goal by Adam Vinatieri, 20–17.
 Two years after that, in Super Bowl XXXVIII against New England, this time as a member of the Panthers, Proehl again caught a touchdown pass with 1:08 remaining in the fourth quarter to tie the game. However, the Patriots won the game on another last-second field goal by Vinatieri, 32–29.
 Proehl and Vinatieri became teammates in Indianapolis and were part of the Colts team that won Super Bowl XLI.

Personal life
Proehl and his wife, Kelly, live in Greensboro, North Carolina. The couple have three children: one daughter named Alex, and two sons named Austin and Blake. Austin played wide receiver at the University of North Carolina. He was selected in the 2018 NFL Draft by the Buffalo Bills as the 255th overall pick, and is currently a wide receiver with the St. Louis BattleHawks of the XFL, where he is coached by his father. Blake played wide receiver for East Carolina University, and was signed as an undrafted free agent to the Minnesota Vikings.

Proehl owns, manages, and coaches at Proehlific Park, which is a sports performance complex and fitness center he built in Greensboro, North Carolina.

References

External links
 The Ricky Proehl 'First Down for Kids' Foundation

1968 births
American football wide receivers
Arizona Cardinals players
Carolina Panthers players
Chicago Bears players
Indianapolis Colts players
Living people
Hillsborough High School (New Jersey) alumni
Sportspeople from Hillsborough Township, New Jersey
Phoenix Cardinals players
Seattle Seahawks players
St. Louis Rams players
Wake Forest Demon Deacons football players
Carolina Panthers coaches
Players of American football from New Jersey